Calometridae is a family of echinoderms belonging to the order Comatulida.

Genera:
 Calometra Clark, 1907
 Gephyrometra Clark, 1912
 Kiimetra Shibata & Oji, 2007
 Neometra Clark, 1912
 Pectinometra Clark, 1912
 Reometra Clark, 1934

References

Comatulida
Echinoderm families